Kim Han-sup (Hangul: 김한섭; born 8 May 1982) is a South Korean football player.

External links
 
 

1982 births
Living people
Association football forwards
South Korean footballers
Changwon City FC players
Korean Police FC (Semi-professional) players
Daejeon Hana Citizen FC players
Incheon United FC players
Korea National League players
K League 1 players
K League 2 players
Dongguk University alumni
Sportspeople from Incheon